Bob or Bobby James may refer to:

Bob James (musician) (born 1939), American jazz keyboardist, arranger and producer of music
Bob James (baseball) (born 1958), former baseball player for the Expos, Tigers, and White Sox
Bob James (rock singer) (1952–2021), American singer-songwriter, frontman of Montrose, 1974–76
Bob James (country singer) (born 1960), English singer-songwriter, former representative of CMT Europe, 1995–97
Bob James, saxophonist and guitar player for British progressive rock band Skin Alley
Bobby James (American football), American football coach
"Bobby James" (song), song by N*E*R*D

See also
Robbie James (1957–1998), Welsh international footballer
Robert James (disambiguation)
Rob James (disambiguation)